Antônio "Nino" Schembri (born June 1, 1974 in Rio de Janeiro) is a Brazilian practitioner of Brazilian jiu-jitsu (BJJ) and former mixed martial artist. He is a former member of the Chute Boxe Academy and currently trains with Black House. Schembri is highly accomplished in sport BJJ, having won the 1996 Brazilian National Championship in the absolute division world championships in his weight class back to back in 1997/1998. Schembri has a unique style of Jiu-Jitsu with focus on submission and creative attacks. At 1999 Pan-American he had phenomenal wins and became known as "El Nino", in analogy to the natural phenomenon El Niño.

Schembri is sometimes nicknamed "Elvis" because he is an Elvis Presley fan and used to mimic some of Elvis's dance moves to celebrate his victories. Today, Schembri teaches at his own gym located in Lawndale, California.

Biography
Antônio Schembri was born into an Italian Brazilian family in Rio de Janeiro. In his youth, Schembri worked in his family's street market, helping his Italian-born father selling duvets. He began training in Brazilian jiu-jitsu at age five under Marcelo and Silvio Behring in the New Ipanema neighborhood of Rio de Janeiro, before coming under the tutelage of Jorge Pereira at thirteen. As an 18 year old blue belt, Schembri moved to the Gracie Barra Academy to study under Carlos Gracie Jr. and Renzo Gracie. After training at Gracie Barra for two years, he was promoted to black belt.

Schembri began competing in mixed martial arts (MMA) in 2001 after joining the Pride Fighting Championships in Japan. In his debut match, he defeated Luta Livre fighter Johil de Oliveira at Pride 14 on 27 May 2001. Around that time, Schembri left Gracie Barra and joined the Chute Boxe Academy, where he became the gym's grappling coach while learning striking from Rafael Cordeiro. At Pride 25 on 16 March 2003, Schembri scored the most significant victory of his career by defeating Kazushi Sakuraba by technical knockout. Schembri's father committed suicide in 2004, leaving Nino devastated and affecting his ability to focus and train consistently. During this time period, his record suffered and he retired with a 5-5 MMA record in 2008. Schembri returned to competing in jiu-jitsu in 2010, stating in an interview to the Fightworks Podcast that he was finally recovered mentally from his father's death.

He moved to the United States and opened a jiu-jitsu academy in Lawndale, California.

Mixed martial arts record

|-
| Loss
| align=center| 5–5
| Mauro Chimento Jr.
| TKO (punches)
| Fury FC 7 - Final Combat
| 
| align=center| 1
| align=center| 0:30
| Barueri, Brazil
| 
|-
| Win
| align=center| 5–4
| Daniel Grandmaison
| Submission (armbar)
| HCF: Crow's Nest
| 
| align=center| 1
| align=center| 2:37
| Gatineau, Canada
| 
|-
| Win
| align=center| 4–4
| Amir Rahnavardi
| Submission (triangle armbar)
| MMAC: The Revolution
| 
| align=center| 1
| align=center| 0:57
| Washington, D.C., United States
| 
|-
| Loss
| align=center| 3–4
| Matt Lindland
| TKO
| Cage Rage 14
| 
| align=center| 3
| align=center| 3:33
| London, England
| 
|-
| Loss
| align=center| 3–3
| Ryo Chonan
| Decision (unanimous)
| Pride: Bushido 7
| 
| align=center| 2
| align=center| 5:00
| Tokyo, Japan
| 
|-
| Loss
| align=center| 3–2
| Kazushi Sakuraba
| Decision (unanimous)
| PRIDE Critical Countdown 2004
| 
| align=center| 3
| align=center| 5:00
| Saitama, Japan
| 
|-
| Loss
| align=center| 3–1
| Kazuhiro Hamanaka
| Decision (unanimous)
| PRIDE 26
| 
| align=center| 3
| align=center| 5:00
| Yokohama, Japan
| 
|-
| Win
| align=center| 3–0
| Kazushi Sakuraba
| TKO (knees and soccer kicks)
| PRIDE 25
| 
| align=center| 1
| align=center| 6:15
| Yokohama, Japan
| 
|-
| Win
| align=center| 2–0
| Daiju Takase
| Decision (split)
| PRIDE The Best Vol.2
| 
| align=center| 2
| align=center| 5:00
| Tokyo, Japan
| 
|-
| Win
| align=center| 1–0
| Johil de Oliveira
| Submission (armbar)
| Pride 14 - Clash of the Titans
| 
| align=center| 1
| align=center| 7:17
| Yokohama, Japan
|

ADCC Submission Grappling Record

References

External links

Living people
Brazilian male mixed martial artists
Welterweight mixed martial artists
Middleweight mixed martial artists
Mixed martial artists utilizing Brazilian jiu-jitsu
Brazilian practitioners of Brazilian jiu-jitsu
People awarded a black belt in Brazilian jiu-jitsu
Sportspeople from Rio de Janeiro (city)
Brazilian emigrants to the United States
1974 births
Sportspeople from Manhattan Beach, California
People from Redondo Beach, California
Brazilian people of Italian descent